Knowledge enterprise, also named as knowledge company or knowledge-intensive company, organization or enterprise. According  to D. Jemielniak, origin, and scope of this term is unclear. How this can be understood depends on how much company  depends on knowledge, that in such a configuration, should be  a critical asset of an organization. There is no agreement on how knowledge-intensive (to what extent) companies should be to be named like so. However, there are some hints to distinguish knowledge companies, since in economies, there are two groups of companies, of which one is labor-intensive, and another knowledge-intensive.

Knowledge enterprises are defined as enterprises where knowledge and knowledge-based products are offered to the market. The products and services can vary from plans to prototypes or mass-produced products where R&D costs are a large part. Employees of knowledge enterprises usually have an academic education. It's not a must but it is seen as an indicator of theoretical and analytical abilities and facilitating them. Education is also legitimisation of expert status and high fees. The work in knowledge enterprises is based on employees' intellectual skills and the tasks are not routine. The skill of combining different knowledge is required.

Emergence of knowledge enterprises 
According to Jemielniak, knowledge enterprises have emerged due to changes in the global economy, which throughout decades has been giving greater priorities to services. The emergence of knowledge companies is also called as a symptom of the third industrial revolution where boundaries between owners of production resources, and workers. On the example of IBM it can be seen that such a change have influenced the structure of income of companies. In 1924, IBM's profits were generated by leasing of manufacturing equipment in 96%, while punched cards were responsible for 4% of the profit. In 1970's, 80% of profit came from equipment divisions, 15% from software division and 5% from services. In 1990's services contributed to 30% of IBM's profits, later in 2007 it was already 45% that the company had earned from rendering services, and 20% from software. This example only reflects the overall change, that is manifested by the reversed proportion between tangible and intangible assets of companies. This evolution has forced a shift in the access to these resources from manual to non-manual (knowledge) workers. Also decision making power is handed in top-down, from owners, and top managers to mid-managers and specialists. These developments accompany the emergence and  growing importance of knowledge enterprises.

Classification of knowledge enterprises 
Knowledge enterprises, according to Lowendahl, can  be divided into:
Client-based companies, which in terms of strategic concentration are client-oriented, which resources are controlled individually, and example industries that can be mentioned are law offices and accounting bureaus,
Problem solving-oriented companies, which strategic concentration is focused on creative problem solving, and innovation, their resources allocated on team basis, example industries: advertising companies, software development companies,
Output-based companies, which strategic concentration is based on adaptability and application of already existing solutions, resources are allocated by the organization, and example companies are: management consultancy companies.
In another approach knowledge companies are divided into professional service companies, and research and development companies.

Companies with multiple units can have a situation where only some of those units are so called knowledge-intensive units. They work for the whole enterprise and their services are usually not offered outside the company. For example R&D, designing, engineering, accounting and law units can be seen as knowledge-intensive units.

Tools of knowledge enterprises 
Knowledge enterprises, due to their high-tech profile, chiefly have to base on IT technologies, including hardware and software to conduct managerial processes, and to organize working environments for all the staff, from executive to top management. This is why software development is crucial for existence and evolution of such companies. Software applications are developed for many areas within such organizations, since without them it is difficult to control, and coordinate work that is dedicated to innovation, and problem solving.

Knowledge enterprises and brain drain 
The main reason of ‘brain drain’ phenomenon and involvement of knowledge companies into it, is a great gap between educational infrastructure in the origin countries that IT professionals can get (but it is not limited to this profession), and low wages that they can be proposed  in the origin country. The problem is that educational infrastructure in the  transition countries (Central and Eastern Europe) does not actually  have to catch-up with the counterparts in knowledge-based economies, like the United States. However salaries of the knowledge workers in both groups of countries differ very much. Knowledge-intensive companies from knowledge-based economies may propose much better incentives to have them move and work for them. This is the reason why human resources from transition countries are drained to those countries, that are characterized by the salary competitive advantage.

References

Knowledge
Types of business entity